Healing Hearts is a 2015 Philippine television drama series broadcast by GMA Network. It premiered on the network's Afternoon Prime line up from May 11, 2015 to September 11, 2015, replacing Kailan Ba Tama ang Mali?.

Mega Manila ratings are provided by AGB Nielsen Philippines.

Series overview

Episodes

May 2015

June 2015

July 2015

August 2015

September 2015

Episodes notes

References

Lists of Philippine drama television series episodes